The Swimming competition of the 10th FINA World Aquatics Championships consisted of 40 long course (50m) events, swum July 20–27, 2003 in Barcelona, Spain. Swimming's 40 events were split evenly between males and females (20 each) and were:
freestyle (free): 50, 100, 200, 400, 800 and 1500;
backstroke (back): 50, 100 and 200;
breaststroke (breast): 50, 100 and 200;
butterfly (fly): 50, 100 and 200;
Individual Medley (IM): 200 and 400; and
relay: 4×100 and 4×200 freestyle, and 4×100 medley.

Participating nations

Event schedule

Results

Men

Legend: WR – World Record; CR – Championship Record

Women

Legend: WR – World Record; CR – Championship Record

Medal standings

References

 
2003 World Aquatics Championships
World Aquatics Championships
Swimming at the World Aquatics Championships